Rogelio Neil "Oneil" Pepito Roque is a Filipino politician who is the governor of Bukidnon

Career
Roque hails from the city of Valencia, Bukidnon, serving as councilor from 2010 to 2013. In 2013, he was elected as representative of Bukidnon's fourth district in the House of Representatives. He would be reelected for two more consecutive terms in 2016 and 2019.

He would run for governor of Bukidnon for the 2022 election where the successor of outgoing governor Jose Maria Zubiri Jr. was to be determined. He was running under the Nacionalista Party. Roque's rival was governor Zubiri's son and third district representative Manuel Zubiri. Roque would win the election.

Personal life
Roque is married to Laarni Lavin who is also a politician.

References

People from Bukidnon
Living people
Members of the House of Representatives of the Philippines from Bukidnon
Governors of Bukidnon